Tuzlaspor is a Turkish professional football club based in Tuzla, Istanbul. They play in the TFF First League. The club plays in white and blue kits, and have done so since their formation in 1954.

League participations 
 TFF First League: 2020–
 TFF Second League: 2015–20
 TFF Third League: 2013–15
 Turkish Regional Amateur League: 2012–13
 Turkish Amateur Football League: 1954–2012

Stadium
Currently the team plays at the 2200 capacity Tuzla Belediyesi Stadı.

Players

Current squad

Other players under contract

Out on loan

References

External links
Official website
Tuzlaspor on TFF.org

Football clubs in Turkey
1954 establishments in Turkey
Association football clubs established in 1954
Football clubs in Istanbul